The Paglia Orba (pronounced ) is a mountain peak in the Monte Cinto massif in Corsica. 
Relatively isolated, this peak, notable for its characteristic tooth-shaped silhouette, dominates the Fango Valley and the west coast of the island.

Geography 

It is nearly  lower than Monte Cinto. 
The Golo, the longest river in Corsica, rises at its feet.

On its slopes at an altitude of  the Ruisseau Orba rises in the communal forest of Albertacce, which is a monoculture of laricio pines.

Geology 

Unlike the other summits of the Cinto massif, which are formed mainly of volcanic rocks, the Paglia Orba is made up of sandstone and conglomerates (puddingstone) with some boulders exceeding  in size.

These sedimentary rocks accumulated during the Permian-Triassic within a vast zone of volcanic collapse (a lake occupying a caldera), before being raised to altitude then largely destroyed by erosion during the tertiary era.
Only a few rare vestiges of this sedimentary filling remain today, including the Paglia Orba preserved on the southwestern edge of this caldera.

Access

The normal access road to the summit is somewhere between hiking and mountaineering. 
From the Ciottulu a i Mori refuge, a path leads to the Col des Maures  (Moorish Pass) and then up a very steep corridor on the western slope of the Paglia Orba. 
The route marked by cairns then overlooks a cliff to reach a first summit, separated from the true summit by a ravine called "combe des Chèvres". 
Other steep routes exist on the south side (vertical fractures or chimneys) but require experience in climbing.

Experienced hikers and mountaineers can also complete the tour of the Paglia Orba by crossing the "Geologists' Breach", named in memory of a geologist who died there,) and the "Sphinx Breach", near a characteristic looking rock block.

Climbing 

The dizzying faces and ridges of this "queen of the Corsican mountains" offer climbers a multitude of routes rated “AD” to “ED”.

Notes

Sources

*

Mountains of Haute-Corse